Suburra is a neighborhood of Ancient Rome. 

Suburra may also refer to:

 Suburra (film), 2015 Italian film based on the novel
 Suburra, a 2013 novel by Giancarlo De Cataldo and Carlo Bonini, and the basis of the 2015 film Suburra
 Suburra: Blood on Rome, Italian television crime drama based on the film